Ecological Intervention was a political party in Greece that was part of the Coalition of the Radical Left. It was created in February 2007 and participated in the Coalition of the Radical Left. The party was created by initiative of Greek ecologists, environmentalist and social movement Hoop of the People and independent activists of political ecology.

In November 2007 the party was broken and dissolved. Most of the members of the Ecological Intervention founded the political organization Ecosocialists.

Ecosocialist parties
Defunct socialist parties in Greece
Political parties established in 2007
2007 establishments in Greece
Political parties disestablished in 2007
2007 disestablishments in Greece